Jan Jaroslav Strejček (16 February 1886 in Prague – 25 March 1943 in Zámostí, Hluboká nad Vltavou), better known by his stage name Jan Bor, was a Czechoslovak director and playwright. He was a pupil of Max Reinhardt. His drama became the basis of Jiří Pauer's libretto for the opera Zuzana Vojířová (1958).

References

1886 births
1943 deaths
Theatre directors from Czechoslovakia
Dramatists and playwrights from Czechoslovakia